Filip Hållander (born 29 June 2000) is a Swedish ice hockey centre currently playing for the Wilkes-Barre/Scranton Penguins of the American Hockey League (AHL) as a prospect under contract to the Pittsburgh Penguins of the National Hockey League (NHL).

Playing career
He was selected by Pittsburgh with the 58th overall pick in the 2018 NHL Entry Draft. On 15 July 2018, Hållander signed a three-year entry-level contract with the Pittsburgh Penguins.

He was returned to continue his development with original club, Timrå IK, after gaining promotion to the SHL. In the 2018–19 season, Hållander scored 7 goals and 14 assists as a rookie during his first SHL season and was the second best point producer for Timrå in their qualifying games with 5 goals and 3 assists in 7 matches, in their relegation and return to the HockeyAllsvenskan.

On 29 April 2019, Hållander signed a two-year contract to remain on loan in the SHL from the Penguins with Luleå HF.

On 25 August 2020, Hållander was traded by the Penguins to the Toronto Maple Leafs along with Evan Rodrigues, David Warsofsky and the 15th overall pick in the 2020 NHL Entry Draft (Rodion Amirov) in exchange for Kasperi Kapanen, Jesper Lindgren and Pontus Åberg. After another season with Luleå, where he recorded a career-high 13 goals in 51 SHL games, his team was defeated in the first round of the SHL playoffs by Skellefteå AIK. That offseason, on July 17, 2021, Hållander was traded by the Maple Leafs back to Pittsburgh, along with a 7th-round pick, in exchange for Jared McCann.

Career statistics

Regular season and playoffs

International

Notes

References

External links
 

2000 births
Living people
Luleå HF players
People from Sundsvall
Pittsburgh Penguins draft picks
Pittsburgh Penguins players
Swedish ice hockey centres
Timrå IK players
Wilkes-Barre/Scranton Penguins players
Sportspeople from Västernorrland County